SVJ may refer to:

stochastic volatility jump (financial mathematics)
Lamborghini Aventador SVJ ("Super Veloce Jota"), a hypercar
Svolvær Airport, Helle, Norway (IATA airport code: SVJ, ICAO airport code: ENSH)
Silver Air (Djibouti) (ICAO airline code: SVJ), airline
Sajiyavadar (rail station code: SVJ), see List of railway stations in India
Science & Vie Junior (magazine)

See also

 JSV (disambiguation)
 SJV (disambiguation)
 JVS (disambiguation)
 VJS (disambiguation)